Gregor is a masculine given name. Notable people and fictional characters with the name include:

People
 Gregor Abel (born 1949), Scottish footballer
 Gregor Adlercreutz (1898–1944), Swedish equestrian
 Gregor Aichinger (c. 1565–1628), German composer
 Gregor Amann (born 1962), German politician
 Gregor Arbet (born 1983), Estonian basketball player
 Gregor Bailar (born 1963), American businessman
 Gregor Bajde (born 1994), Slovenian footballer
 Gregor Balažic (born 1988), Slovenian footballer
 Gregor Baumgartner (born 1979), Austrian ice hockey player
 Gregor Becke (born 1972), Austrian canoer
 Gregor Belkovsky (1865–1948), Zionist activist
 Gregor Benko (born 1944), American music historian
 Gregor Bermbach (born 1981), German bobsledder
 Gregor Betz (born 1948), German swimmer
 Gregor Bialowas (born 1959), Austrian weightlifter
 Gregor Blanco (born 1983), Venezuelan baseball player
 Gregor Blatnik (born 1972), Slovenian footballer
 Gregor Brandmüller (1661–1691), Swiss painter
 Gregor Braun (born 1955), German cyclist
 Gregor Breinburg (born 1991), Aruban footballer
 Gregor Brown (born 2001), Scottish rugby union player
 Gregor Brück (1483–1557), German figure of the Reformation, and Saxon Chancellor
 Gregor Buchanan (born 1990), Scottish footballer
 Gregor Cailliet, American scientist
 Gregor Cameron (born 1964), New Zealand athlete
 Gregor Cankar (born 1975), Slovenian long jumper
 Gregor Chatsatourian (born 1977), Greek handball player
 Gregor Clemens (born 1982), German fashion designer
 Gregor Collins (born 1976), American actor, writer and producer
 Gregor Croudis (born 1993), New Zealand cricketer
 Gregor Cvijič (born 1972), Slovenian handball player
 Gregor Deschwanden (born 1991), Swiss ski jumper
 Gregor Dorfmeister (1929–2018), German writer
 Gregor Duncan (artist) (1910–1944), American illustrator
 Gregor Duncan (bishop) (born 1950), Scottish Episcopalian bishops
 Gregor Ebner (1892–1974), German military doctor
 Gregor Edelmann (born 1954), German journalist and screenwriter
 Gregor Edmunds (born 1977), Scottish athlete
 Gregor Erhart, German sculptor
 Gregor Ewan (born 1971), Scottish wheelchair curler
 Gregor Fink (born 1984), Slovenian footballer
 Gregor Fisher (born 1953), Scottish comedian and actor
 Gregor Fisken (born 1964), British racing driver
 Gregor Foitek (born 1965), Swiss racing driver
 Gregor Fučka (born 1971), Slovenian-Italian basketball player and coach
 Gregor Gall (born 1967), British academic
 Gregor Gazvoda (born 1981), Slovenian cyclist
 Gregor George, Australian rugby union player
 Gregor Gillespie (born 1987), American mixed martial artist
 Gregor Glas (born 2001), Slovenian basketball player
 Gregor Golobič (born 1964), Slovenian politician
 Gregor Grant (born 1911), British writer
 Gregor Grilc (born 1970), Slovenian alpine skier
 Gregor Gysi (born 1948), German politician
 Gregor Hagedorn (born 1965), German botanist
 Gregor Haloander (1501–1531), German legal scholar
 Gregor Hammerl (born 1942), Austrian politician
 Gregor Hasler, Swiss psychiatrist
 Gregor Hauffe (born 1982), German rower
 Gregor Hayter (born 1976), Scottish rugby union player
 Gregor Helfenstein (1559–1632), Roman Catholic prelate
 Gregor Henderson, Australian Christian minister
 Gregor Herzfeld (born 1975), German musicologist
 Gregor Hildebrandt (born 1974), German contemporary artist
 Gregor Jordan (born 1966), Australian film director
 Gregor Mackintosh, lead guitarist and main composer of English doom metal band Paradise Lost
 Gregor McGregor (1848–1914), Australian politician
 Gregor Mendel (1822–1884), scientist, father of genetics
 Gregor Mühlberger (born 1994), Austrian cyclist
 Gregor Wilhelm Nitzsch (1790–1861), German classical scholar
 Gregor Piatigorsky (1903–1976), Russian-born American cellist
 Gregor Schlierenzauer (born 1990), Austrian ski jumper
 Gregor Strasser (1892–1934), German Nazi Party official and politician
 Gregor Townsend (born 1973), Scottish rugby union player and coach
 Gregor Urbas (born 1982), Slovenian figure skater
 Gregor Verbinski (born 1964), American film director, also known as Gore Verbinski
 Gregor Virant (born 1969), Slovenian politician
 Gregor Weiss (born 1941), American artistic gymnast
 Gregor Wenning (born 1964), German neurologist
 Gregor Wentzel (1898–1978), German physicist
 Gregor Werner (1693–1766), Austrian classical composer
 Gregor Widholm (born 1948), Austrian academic and musician
 Gregor Willmes (born 1966), German musicologist
 Gregor W. Yeates (1944–2012), New Zealand scientist
 Gregor Young (born 1966), Canadian soccer player and coach

Fictional characters
 Gregor Clegane, nicknamed "The Mountain", a character in George R.R. Martin's A Song of Ice and Fire and its television adaptation Game of Thrones
 Gregor Samsa, main character of Franz Kafka's The Metamorphosis
 King Gregor Markov, a supporting character in DC Comics' Young Justice'''s third season
 Gregor, a beetle-shaped demon in the novel Slawter Gregor, the protagonist of The Underland Chronicles Gregor, the slave name given to Severin by Wanda in the Leopold von Sacher-Masoch novel Venus In Furs''

See also
 Gregory (given name)

Masculine given names